List of Rulers of the Ngoni Dynasty of Maseko (Gomani) (Malawi):

{|
Term
Incumbent
Notes 
|-
|colspan="3"|Maseko Dynasty (Gomani Dynasty)
|-
|colspan="3"|Inkosi ya makosi (Paramount chief)
|-
|? to 1832||Ngwana, Inkosi ya makosi
|-
|valign=top rowspan="2"|1832 to 1835||Magadlela, Co-Regent 
|-
|Mgoola, Co-Regent
|-
|1835 to 1860||Maseko Mputa, Inkosi ya makosi
|-
|1860 to 1878||Cidiaonga, Regent
|-
|1878 to 18xx||Cikusi, Inkosi ya makosi
|-
|18xx to 1896||Gomani I, Inkosi ya makosi
|-
|1896 to 1954||Philip Gomani II, Inkosi ya makosi
|-
|1954 to 2008||Willard Gomani III, Inkosi ya makosi
|-
|2008 to 2009||Gomani IV, Inkosi ya makosi
|-
|2009 to ||Willard Gomani V,Inkosi ya makosi
|}

External links

Government of Eswatini
History of Eswatini
Swaziland
Eswatini-related lists